Vanjiar River is a branch river of Cauvery River. It flows through the districts of Thanjavur and Karaikal. This river finally merges with Arasalar River.

References

Rivers of Puducherry
Rivers of Tamil Nadu
Rivers of India